= Suseri =

Village in Maharashtra

- Village
- Interactive map of Suseri
- Coordinates: 17°43′11″N 73°22′57″E
- Country: India
- State: Maharashtra

Suseri is a small village in Ratnagiri district, Maharashtra state in Western India. The 2011 Census of India recorded a total of 1,354 residents in the village. Suseri's geographical area is 333 hectares (820 acres).
